Power of Three is the second album released from Fatso Jetson, and the last to appear on SST Records.

Track listing

Personnel
Mario Lalli – guitar, vocals
Larry Lalli – bass
Tony Tornay – drums
Vince Meghrouni – harmonica, flute

Credits
Cover Design by Mario Lalli & Mike Maracha

Painting (back cover) by Mario Lalli

References 

Fatso Jetson albums
SST Records albums
1997 albums